Omoglymmius opacus is a species of beetle in the subfamily Rhysodidae. It was described by R.T. Bell and J.R. Bell in 1985. It is known from Padang, Sumatra (Indonesia).

Omoglymmius opacus holotype, a female, measures  in length.

References

opacus
Beetles of Indonesia
Endemic fauna of Sumatra
Beetles described in 1985